Karen Wolfson is a poker player from Las Vegas, Nevada.  She has cashed in various poker tournaments during her career, and has several titles including one World Series of Poker bracelet.

World Series of Poker
She won her championship in the 1984 World Series of Poker $500 Ladies Limit Seven Card Stud event, earning a bracelet and a cash prize of 15,500.  She defeated professional player Marsha Waggoner heads-up to win the tournament.  This event was the first time that Wolfson had finished in the money at the World Series of Poker.

Wolfson also finished in 2nd place of the Ladies event, then a $1,000 buy-in Seven Card Stud event in 1995, losing heads-up to Starla Brodie, and again in 1997, losing heads-up to Susie Isaacs.

As of 2010, her total tournament winnings exceed $190,000.  Her five cashes at the World Series of Poker make up $62,560 of that total.

World Series of Poker bracelet

References

Living people
American poker players
World Series of Poker bracelet winners
Female poker players
People from the Las Vegas Valley
Year of birth missing (living people)